Craig Rodman (born 4 October 1972) is a retired American skier who competed at two Winter Olympics.

1992 Winter Olympics
Rodman made the finals of the men's moguls at the 1992 Winter Olympics where he finished 13th.  Rodman earned the last qualifying spot in the finals by finishing 16th in the qualification round.  He was injured after the Olympics.

1994 Winter Olympics
Rodman missed the finals of the men's moguls at the 1992 Winter Olympics by 2 places and .33 points, where he finished 18th.

Post-Olympic skiing career
Rodman wan a world cup event at La Clusaz, France during the 1995-96 season.

Post-skiing career
Rodman became an announcer.

References

Living people
1972 births
Freestyle skiers at the 1992 Winter Olympics
Freestyle skiers at the 1994 Winter Olympics
Olympic freestyle skiers of the United States
American male freestyle skiers